Abia Comets is a Nigerian football club based in Umuahia. They play in the second-tier in Nigerian football, the Nigeria National League. 5,000 capacity Umuahia Township Stadium is the home of Abia Comets FC.

Current squad

 
CHIEF COACH : Bethel Orji
TM : John Onuoha
CLUB PRESIDENT : Hon. Victor Nwakanma
CLUB SECRETARY : Ezindu Hyacinth

Football clubs in Nigeria
Sports clubs in Nigeria
Abia State

References